Kentwood-In-The-Pines is an unincorporated community,  east-southeast of Julian in San Diego County, California.

References

External links
 USGS Map Name:  Julian, CA from Topoquest website, accessed 3/22/2013  Shows Kentwood-In-The-Pines in a current USGS topographic map.

Unincorporated communities in San Diego County, California
Unincorporated communities in California